Copelatus schuhi is a species of diving beetle. It is part of the subfamily Copelatinae in the family Dytiscidae. It was described by Hendrich & Balke in 1998.

References

schuhi
Beetles described in 1998